Iveta Klimášová (born 14 January 1998) is a Slovak ice hockey player and member of the Slovak national ice hockey team, currently playing in the European Women's Hockey League (EWHL) with the women's representative team of MAC Budapest. She and national team teammate Lenka Čurmová were the first Slovak players to play in the Premier Hockey Federation (PHF; called NWHL until 2021). 

She wears the number 8 after Alexander Ovechkin.

References

External links
 

Living people
1998 births
People from Gelnica
Sportspeople from the Košice Region
Slovak women's ice hockey forwards
Buffalo Beauts players
Slovak expatriate sportspeople in Hungary
Slovak expatriate ice hockey players in the United States
MAC Budapest (women) players
European Women's Hockey League players
Expatriate ice hockey players in Hungary